"Party Hard" is a song by Andrew W.K..

It may also refer to:
"Party Hard" (Pulp song), a song by Pulp
Party Hard (album), an album by Donae'o
Party Hard (video game), a 2015 Ukrainian video game
"Party Hard / Cadillac (Interlude)", a song by Chris Brown from Fortune